Daniel Michael Bidois (born 1983) is a New Zealand politician and economist who sat as the National Party Member for Northcote in the New Zealand House of Representatives. Bidois was elected on 9 June 2018 as the Member for Northcote. He was a Strategy Manager for Foodstuffs prior to his election.

Early life and education
Bidois is both of European and Māori descent, adopted into a family of Ngāti Maniapoto descent. He grew up in Howick, Auckland and attended Our Lady Star of the Sea Catholic Primary School, Howick Intermediate and Howick College. Bidois left Howick College at 15 to pursue a butchery apprenticeship, originally with Seaside Meats. Within two weeks of beginning his apprenticeship, he was diagnosed with Ewing Sarcoma, a rare form of bone cancer. He had chemotherapy and an operation to save his leg.  Having overcome cancer, Bidois decided to continue with his butchery career, completing an apprenticeship with Woolworths Supermarket in Newmarket.

Bidois later graduated with Bachelor of Commerce (Hons) and Bachelor of Arts degrees at the University of Auckland.

In 2010, Bidois won a Fulbright Scholarship to attend Harvard University in the United States, completing a Master of Public Policy degree in 2012.

Professional career
Bidois began his professional career as a management consultant with Deloitte New Zealand in 2008. In 2010, he joined the New Zealand Institute where he published research on improving New Zealand's economy. He spent three years as an economist with the OECD in Paris, France, working on economic reforms in emerging markets. In addition, he spent a further year in 2015 as an independent strategy consultant to the Malaysian public sector in Kuala Lumpur. He returned to New Zealand in 2016, and worked as a strategy manager for Foodstuffs.

Political career
Bidois contested the National Party selection for  upon the retirement of Maurice Williamson, but failed to win the candidacy. He stood as a list-only candidate in the 2017 general election, ranked 72.

Member of Parliament

On 22 March 2018, then-Member for Northcote Jonathan Coleman announced his resignation from Parliament, triggering the first by-election of the 52nd Parliament. On 15 April, Bidois was chosen as National's candidate for the Northcote by-election, which he subsequently won by 6.28%, receiving 10,566 votes and taking 50.67% of the overall vote. Bidois was sworn into the 52nd Parliament on 27 June 2018 as the Member for Northcote and gave his maiden speech on 3 July 2018.

On 3 July 2018, Bidois was announced as National's Spokesperson for the Future of Work, and Associate Spokesperson for Workplace Relations and Safety. This created criticism due to his views on trade unions.

Transport was a major campaign issue of Bidois' during the 2018 by-election. Since election he has challenged Auckland Transport on delivery of services locally including petitions with his Onewa Road petition gathering over 4,000 signatures.

Ahead of the 2020 general election he was ranked at 43 on National's party list. At the election, Bidois lost Northcote to his by-election Labour opponent, Shanan Halbert, by a final margin of 2,534 votes, and was ranked too low on National's list to return to Parliament as a list MP.

In November 2022, the National party once again selected Bidois as their candidate for the Northcote electorate ahead of the 2023 New Zealand general election, set to be held in 2023.

References

1983 births
Living people
New Zealand National Party MPs
Members of the New Zealand House of Representatives
Unsuccessful candidates in the 2017 New Zealand general election
21st-century New Zealand politicians
Māori politicians
Ngāti Maniapoto people
New Zealand MPs for Auckland electorates
University of Auckland alumni
Harvard Kennedy School alumni
Candidates in the 2020 New Zealand general election
Unsuccessful candidates in the 2020 New Zealand general election